Riverina Highway is a -long state highway located in the Riverina region of New South Wales, Australia. The road was constructed over several decades with final asphalt concrete sealing completed during the 1960s.

Route
The eastern terminus of Riverina Highway is located on the eastern shore of the Hume Weir, which impounds the Murray River, east of Albury. The Bethanga Bridge carries the highway across the weir as the highway generally heads west by northwest, following the course of the Murray River to reach its western terminus at Deniliquin. From this point the highway follows the Mulwala Canal westward until it reaches Deniliquin, terminating at its junction with Cobb Highway.

The highway passes irrigated farms, orchards and vineyards. It links this area to major markets in Sydney via Hume Highway in Albury, and in Melbourne via the C371 in Berrigan or Cobb Highway in Deniliquin. The highway is also a popular tourist route with scenic countryside, fishing and historic spots along its path.

History
The passing of the Main Roads Act of 1924 through the Parliament of New South Wales provided for the declaration of Main Roads, roads partially funded by the State government through the Main Roads Board (later the Department of Main Roads, and eventually Transport for NSW). Main Road No. 131 was declared from Hopefield to Lowesdale (and continuing north via Daysdale to Urana), and Main Road No. 212 was declared from the intersection with Hume Highway in Albury, via Howlong to Corowa (and continuing westwards via Tocumwal and Tuppal to the intersection with Moama-Booligal Road, today Cobb Highway, in Deniliquin), on the same day, 8 August 1928.

The Department of Main Roads, which had succeeded the New South Wales MRB in 1932, later truncated the western end of Main Road 212 to terminate at Tocumwal, and Main Road No. 331 was declared from Deniliquin via Finley to Berrigan on the same day, 21 February 1933. Main Road No. 355 was declared on 23 September 1936, from Albury to the state border with Victoria at Bethanga.

State Highway 20 was declared on 16 March 1938, from the intersection with State Highway 17 (later known as Newell Highway) at Tocumwal via Corowa, Howlong and Albury to the state border with Victoria at Bethanga, subsuming Main Roads 212 and 355. Its western end was re-aligned on 1 February 1950, running from Corowa via Hopefield, Lowesdale, Berrigan and Finley to Denilquin (subsuming Main Road 331); Main Road 131 was truncated to Lowesdale as a result, and the former alignment to Tocumwal was re-declared as Main Road 86 (between the intersection with State Highway 20 just north of Corowa to the state border with Victoria just outside Wahgunyah) and Main Road 550 (between Corowa and Tocumwal). State Highway 20 was named Riverina Highway on 15 September 1954, after the Riverina region the highway runs through.

Riverina Highway was signed National Route 58 across its entire length in 1974. With the conversion to the newer alphanumeric system in 2013, this was replaced with route B58 between East Albury and Deniliquin; from East Albury eastwards to the Victorian border has been left unallocated.

Major junctions

See also

 Highways in Australia
 Highways in New South Wales

References

External links

Riverina
Highways in New South Wales